Chrysoteuchia mandschuricus is a moth in the family Crambidae. It was described by Hugo Theodor Christoph in 1881. It is found in Russia (Amur).

References

Crambini
Moths described in 1881
Moths of Asia